Metamorfosis is the third studio album by Spanish singer Vega, released on 28 April 2009 (see 2009 in music), by Universal Music Spain. After a two-year-long break from the music industry, Vega recorded the album in Miami, under Sebastian Krys' production.

Track listing
 Lolita
 Mejor Mañana
 Nueva York
 Cuánta Decepción
 Nada Es Infinito
 Dentro
 Princesa De Cuento
 Te Tengo A Ti
 Mágico
 Faro De Guía
 A Salvo

2009 albums
Vega (singer) albums
Albums produced by Sebastian Krys